The Amsterdam albatross or Amsterdam Island albatross, (Diomedea amsterdamensis), is a large albatross which breeds only on Amsterdam Island in the southern Indian Ocean. It was only described in 1983, and was thought by some researchers to be a sub-species of the wandering albatross, D. exulans. BirdLife International and the IOC recognize it as a species, James Clements does not, and the SACC has a proposal on the table to split the species. More recently, mitochondrial DNA comparisons between the Amsterdam albatross, the wandering albatross Diomedea exulans, the Antipodean albatross D. antipodensis and the Tristan albatross D. dabbenena, provide clear genetic evidence that the Amsterdam albatross is a separate species.

Taxonomy
Albatrosses belong to the family Diomedeidae of the order Procellariiformes, along with shearwaters, fulmars, storm petrels, and diving petrels. They share certain identifying features. First, they have nasal passages attached to the upper bill called naricorns, although the nostrils on the albatross are on the sides of the bill. The bills of Procellariiformes are also unique in that they are split into between seven and nine horny plates. Finally, they produce a stomach oil made up of wax esters and triglycerides that is stored in the proventriculus. This is used against predators and serves as well as an energy-rich food source for chicks and for adults during their long flights.

Etymology
The scientific name Diomedea amsterdamensis is composed of Diomedea, from the marooned Greek hero Diomedes, whose companions were turned to birds, and amsterdamensis, a Latin form of the name of the island where they are found.

Range and habitat
There is uncertainty regarding its whereabouts when it is not breeding, though there have been possible sightings in Australia and New Zealand.

Description
The Amsterdam albatross is a great albatross that breeds in brown, rather than in the more usual white, plumage. The adult bird has chocolate brown upper parts and is white on its face mask, throat, lower breast, and belly. It has a broad brown breast band along with brown undertail coverts. Its pink bill has a dark tip and dark cutting edges, and finally, its underwings are white except for the dark tip and the dark leading edge.

Behaviour
Because of its rarity, the feeding ecology and at-sea distribution of the Amsterdam albatross is not well understood, although it is believed that the birds eat squid, crustaceans, and fish.

Reproduction
Amsterdam albatrosses breed biennially in the open marshy ground. Both parents incubate the egg in alternate stints that last for about a week, with the chick hatching after 80 days. The chick is brooded for a month and overall takes 230 days to fledge. At first, it is fed by its parents every three days, with the feeding frequency reduced as it approaches fledging. At the peak of weight gain, the chick weighs more than its parents but then loses weight as the extra reserves are used to grow feathers. Having fledged, the young bird stays at sea for around five years before returning to the colony and begins breeding a few years later. The breeding "language" of the Amsterdam albatross is similar to that of the wandering albatross.

Conservation
The population upon discovery was just five breeding pairs; with conservation this has increased to eighteen to twenty-five breeding pairs. Monitored continuously since 1983, the world population is estimated at 80 mature individuals and a total of some 130 birds. The island on which the albatross breeds have undergone a significant decline in habitat condition due to the introduction of ship rats, feral cats and cattle, while the birds are threatened at sea by the practice of longline fishing. The draining of a peat bog on the plateau has degraded the breeding environment, and because there is only one breeding location, they are also especially vulnerable to diseases such as Pasteurella multocida (avian cholera) and Erysipelothrix rhusiopathiae.

To help in conservation efforts banding of the birds and frequent censuses are undertaken. Feral cattle were eliminated from Amsterdam Island in 2010.

References

External links
Fact file and photos - ARKive

Diomedea
Birds of the Indian Ocean
Île Amsterdam
Birds described in 1983